Zero is an unincorporated community in Prairie County, Montana, United States. Its post office is closed.

Notes

Unincorporated communities in Prairie County, Montana
Unincorporated communities in Montana